Sonia Patel is an American psychiatrist and author of young adult novels.

Biography
Patel is a first-generation Indian immigrant.

She received a Bachelor of Arts degree in History from Stanford University and her medical degree from the John A. Burns School of Medicine at the University of Hawaiʻi at Mānoa.

Patel works in Hawai'i on the islands of Oahu and Molokai. She primarily works with young adults who exhibit "emotional issues with behavioral manifestations, gender and/or sexuality issues, abuse of all types, and/or family conflicts, to improve their self-worth, relationships, decision-making, and moods." She also works with families to "resolve complicated family systems issues."

She lives on the Hawaiian island of Oahu with her spouse, two children, and dog.

Publications 

 Rani Patel in Full Effect, published October 11, 2016 by Cinco Puntos Press
 Jaya and Rasa: A Love Story, published September 12, 2017 by Cinco Puntos Press
 Bloody Seoul, published July 2, 2019 by Cinco Puntos Press
 Gita Desai Is Not Here to Shut Up, expected to be published in 2023 by Penguin/Nancy Paulsen Books
 Ab(solutely) Normal, edited by Nora Shalaway Carpenter and Rocky Callen, expected to be published in 2023 by Candlewick Press

Awards and honors

References 

Living people
Stanford University alumni
John A. Burns School of Medicine alumni
Year of birth missing (living people)
American psychiatrists
American women psychiatrists
American writers of young adult literature
Women writers of young adult literature
21st-century American women